The 1986 Milan–San Remo was the 77th edition of the Milan–San Remo cycle race and was held on 15 March 1986. The race started in Milan and finished in San Remo. The race was won by Sean Kelly of the Kas team.

General classification

References

1986
March 1986 sports events in Europe
1986 in road cycling
1986 in Italian sport
1986 Super Prestige Pernod International